The Bajaur campaign refers to an armed conflict between Afghanistan and Pakistan that took place from September 1960 to September 1961 in Bajaur, Pakistan. The conflict was initiated by Afghan Prime Minister Daoud Khan, who sent Royal Afghan Army troops across the porous border into Bajaur in 1960. The Afghan army incursion was repulsed by Pakistan Army and the Pashtun tribesmen in Pakistan.

The battle came to an end after the Afghan forces were routed. Several Afghan troops that were still inside the Pakistani territory, surrendered. As a result of this, diplomatic relations between the two nations worsened because of the armed conflict.

Background 

Relations between the two states of Afghanistan and Pakistan have been strained ever since the latter gained independence from the United Kingdom following the Partition of British India in August 1947. Following partition, the Kingdom of Afghanistan was the only country to vote against the Dominion of Pakistan's admission into the United Nations as a recognized sovereign state. After the independence of Pakistan, Afghanistan operated agents who operated in north-western Pakistan, distributing large amounts of money, ammunition and even transistor radios in an effort to sway loyalties from locals Pakistanis to Afghanistan.

Moreover, Afghanistan did not recognize the Durand Line that is the Pakistan–Afghanistan border (which Pakistan inherited from British India and which Afghanistan marked itself). Due to these large, illicit territorial claims over the western regions of Pakistan—roughly corresponding with the modern-day Pakistani provinces of Balochistan and Khyber Pakhtunkhwa—relations between the two countries soured, and Afghanistan started funding proxies and initiated regular skirmishes with Pakistan along the border.

By 1948, Afghanistan was providing armaments and funding to proxies inside the Tirah and Razmak regions of northwest Pakistan. In the late 1950s, the Royal Afghan Army, with artillery support, attacked the Pakistani village of Dobandi and subsequently crossed the border and occupied a strategically vital railway link in Chaman−Quetta. The incursion prompted a large Pakistani offensive, following which the Pakistan Army retook the pass and pushed Afghan troops back to the border after a week of heavy fighting.

Relations between the two states severely deteriorated in 1951, when Saad Akbar Babrak, an Afghan national, assassinated the then Prime Minister of Pakistan, Liaquat Ali Khan, in Rawalpindi during a public rally. On 30 March 1955, Afghan demonstrators attacked and torched the Pakistani embassy in Kabul and consulates in Kandahar and Jalalabad, following which diplomatic relations were severed by Pakistan. The areas surrounding Bajaur and other parts of the Afghanistan-Pakistan border saw extensive armed border skirmishes between Afghanistan and Pakistan from 1949 to 1971.

Afghan intrusion 
Between 1960 and 1961, thousands of Afghan troops disguised as local militias crossed the extremely porous Pakistan–Afghanistan border and entered the semi-autonomous Bajaur Agency of Pakistan in an effort to annex the region. During this time, Afghanistan also deployed thousands of troops with tanks and artillery along the Afghanistan–Pakistan border and frequently attacked Pakistani tribesmen and military forces from mountainous posts.
Local tribesmen inflicted heavy casualties on Afghan troops, ultimately pushing them back to the international border. The Pakistan Air Force subsequently crossed the Border and bombed numerous Afghan military posts and encampments inside Afghanistan. Several Afghan troops inside Pakistani territory near the border surrendered, following which they were paraded on Pakistani national media, which became an embarrassment for Afghanistan internationally.

See Also 

 Battle of Bajaur - Pakistani Military Operation in Bajaur district.
 Operation Khwakh Ba De Sham
 Operation Desert Hawk
 Operation Black Thunderstorm

References

Battles involving Afghanistan
Battles involving Pakistan
Airstrikes conducted by Pakistan